Duplex (Latin, 'double') may refer to:

Arts and entertainment
 Duplex (film), or Our House, a 2003 American black comedy film
 Duplex (band), a Dutch electronic music duo
 Duplex (Norwegian duo)
 Duplex!, a Canadian children's music band
 The Duplex, an American comic strip by Glenn McCoy
 The Duplex (film), a 2015 Nigerian film

Places
 Duplex, Tennessee, U.S.
 Duplex, Texas, U.S.

Science and technology
 Duplex (moth), a genus of moths in the family Erebidae
 Nucleic acid double helix, a double-stranded molecule of DNA or RNA
 Duplex (telecommunications), communications in both directions simultaneously
 Duplex (typography), a Linotype technique
 Duplex ultrasonography, a medical imaging technique 
 Google Duplex, an extension of Google Assistant

Transportation
 Duplex (automobile), an early car built in Canada in 1923
 Duplex locomotive, a type of steam locomotive
 TGV Duplex, a French high-speed train of the TGV family featuring bi-level carriages

Other uses
 Duplex (building), two living units attached to each other
 Duplex apartment
 Duplex printing, double-sided printing
 Edward Duplex, a 19th-century African-American pioneer

See also